Penicillium kiamaense is a species of the genus of Penicillium.

References

kiamaense
Fungi described in 2014